Vaška  is a village in Croatia. 

One notable resident was Vladimir Kren, an officer of the Royal Yugoslav Air Force before World War II, who defected to Germany and later was appointed as the commander of the Air Force of the Independent State of Croatia; which was a German puppet state.

Populated places in Virovitica-Podravina County